Morshansky District is an administrative and municipal district (raion), one of the twenty-three in Tambov Oblast, Russia. It is located in the north of the oblast and borders Shatsky District of Ryazan Oblast in the north, Zemetchinsky District of Penza Oblast in the east, Pichayevsky District in the south, and Sarayevsky District of Ryazan Oblast in the west. Its administrative center is the town of Morshansk (which is not administratively a part of the district). As of the 2010 Census, the total population of the district was 34,088.

Administrative and municipal status
Within the framework of administrative divisions, Morshansky District is one of the twenty-three in the oblast. The town of Morshansk serves as its administrative center, despite being incorporated separately as a town of oblast significance—an administrative unit with the status equal to that of the districts.

As a municipal division, the district is incorporated as Morshansky Municipal District. The town of oblast significance of Morshansk is incorporated separately from the district as Morshansk Urban Okrug.

References

Notes

Sources

Districts of Tambov Oblast
